Rawley House is a historic home located at Leipsic, Kent County, Delaware.  It dates to the mid-19th century, and is a two-story, three bay, gable roofed frame vernacular dwelling.  It was built as a side hall plan, single pile house and later transformed to a double pile dwelling with additions.  Additions are a two-story lean-to, a one-story, one-room plan lean-to the north and a one-story frame ell to the rear.

It was listed on the National Register of Historic Places in 1983.

References

Houses on the National Register of Historic Places in Delaware
Houses in Kent County, Delaware
National Register of Historic Places in Kent County, Delaware
Leipsic, Delaware